Caladenia clavula, commonly known as the small-clubbed spider orchid, is a plant in the orchid family Orchidaceae and is endemic to South Australia. It is a ground orchid which grows singly or in loose groups and has a singly hairy leaf and usually a single greenish-yellow flower with red stripes.

Description
The dorsal and lateral sepals have a yellowish glandular tip. The middle section curves forward and has shorter teeth on its edges, decreasing in length towards the tip. The central part also has rows of golf-stick shaped calli along it centre. Flowering occurs from August to October.

Taxonomy and naming
Caladenia clavula was first formally described by David L. Jones in 1991 and the description was published in Australian Orchid Research. The type specimen was collected in the Carappee Hill Conservation Park near Darke Peak. The specific epithet (clavula) is a Latin word meaning "little club", referring to the small glands on the ends of the sepals.

Distribution and habitat
This caladenia grows in sparse woodland and mallee in the Flinders Ranges and Eyre Peninsula regions of South Australia.

References

clavula
Plants described in 1991
Endemic orchids of Australia
Orchids of South Australia
Taxa named by David L. Jones (botanist)